The Prose Edda, also known as the Younger Edda, Snorri's Edda or, historically, simply as Edda, is an Old Norse textbook written in Iceland during the early 13th century. The work is often assumed to have been to some extent written, or at least compiled, by the Icelandic scholar, lawspeaker, and historian Snorri Sturluson  1220. It is considered the fullest and most detailed source for modern knowledge of Norse mythology, the body of myths of the North Germanic peoples, and draws from a wide variety of sources, including versions of poems that survive into today in a collection known as the Poetic Edda.

The Prose Edda consists of four sections: The Prologue, a euhemerized account of the Norse gods; Gylfaginning, which provides a question and answer format that details aspects of Norse mythology (consisting of approximately 20,000 words), Skáldskaparmál, which continues this format before providing lists of kennings and heiti (approximately 50,000 words); and Háttatal, which discusses the composition of traditional skaldic poetry (approximately 20,000 words).

Dating from  1300 to 1600, seven manuscripts of the Prose Edda differ from one another in notable ways, which provides researchers with independent textual value for analysis. The Prose Edda appears to have functioned similarly to a contemporary textbook, with the goal of assisting Icelandic poets and readers in understanding the subtleties of alliterative verse, and to grasp the meaning behind the many kennings used in skaldic poetry.

Originally known to scholars simply as Edda, the Prose Edda gained its contemporary name in order to differentiate it from the Poetic Edda. Early scholars of the Prose Edda suspected that there once existed a collection of entire poems, a theory confirmed with the rediscovery of manuscripts of the Poetic Edda.

Naming
The etymology of "Edda" remains uncertain; there are many hypotheses about its meaning and developing, yet little agreement. Some argue that the word derives from the name of Oddi, a town in the south of Iceland where Snorri was raised. Edda could therefore mean "book of Oddi." However, this assumption is generally rejected. Anthony Faulkes in his English translation of the Prose Edda comments that this is "unlikely, both in terms of linguistics and history" since Snorri was no longer living at Oddi when he composed his work.

Another connection was made with the word óðr, which means 'poetry or inspiration' in Old Norse. According to Faulkes, though such a connection is plausible semantically, it is unlikely that "Edda" could have been coined in the 13th century on the basis of "óðr", because such a development "would have had to have taken place gradually", and Edda in the sense of 'poetics' is not likely to have existed in the preliterary period.

Edda also means 'great-grandparent', a word that appears in Skáldskaparmál, which occurs as the name of a figure in the eddic poem Rigsthula and in other medieval texts.

A final hypothesis is derived from the Latin edo, meaning "I write". It relies on the fact that the word "kredda" (meaning "belief") is certified and comes from the Latin "credo", meaning 'I believe'. Edda in this case could be translated as "Poetic Art". This is the meaning that the word was then given in the medieval period.

The now uncommonly used name Sæmundar Edda was given by the Bishop Brynjólfur Sveinsson to the collection of poems contained in the Codex Regius, many of which are quoted by Snorri. Brynjólfur, along with many others of his time incorrectly believed that they were collected by Sæmundr fróði (therefore before the drafting of the Edda of Snorri), and so the Poetic Edda is also known as the Elder Edda.

Manuscripts 
Seven manuscripts of the Prose Edda have survived into the present day: Six copies from the medieval period and another dating to the 1600s. No one manuscript is complete, and each has variations. In addition to three fragments, the four main manuscripts are Codex Regius, Codex Wormianus, Codex Trajectinus, and the Codex Upsaliensis:

The other three manuscripts are AM 748; AM 757 a 4to; and AM 738 II 4to, AM le ß fol. Although some scholars have doubted whether a sound stemma of the manuscripts can be created, due to the possibility of scribes drawing on multiple exemplars or from memory, recent work has found that the main sources of each manuscript can be fairly readily ascertained. The Prose Edda''' remained fairly unknown outside of Iceland until the publication of the Edda Islandorum in 1665.

Authorship
The text is often assumed to have been written or at least compiled to some extent by Snorri Sturluson. This identification is largely based on the following paragraph from a portion of Codex Upsaliensis, an early 14th-century manuscript containing the Edda:

Scholars have noted that this attribution, along with that of other primary manuscripts, is not clear whether or not Snorri is more than the compiler of the work and the author of Háttatal or if he is the author of the entire Edda. Faulkes summarizes the matter of scholarly discourse around the authorship of the Prose Edda as follows:
Snorri’s authorship of the Prose Edda was upheld by the renaissance scholar Arngrímur Jónsson (1568–1648), and since his time it has generally been accepted without question. But the surviving manuscripts, which were all written more than half a century after Snorri’s death, differ from each other considerably and it is not likely that any of them preserves the work quite as he wrote it. A number of passages in Skáldskaparmál especially have been thought to be interpolations, and this section of the work has clearly been subject to various kinds of revision in most manuscripts. It has also been argued that the prologue and the first paragraph and part of the last paragraph of Gylfaginning are not by Snorri, at least in their surviving forms.

Whatever the case, the mention of Snorri in the manuscripts has been influential in a common acceptance of Snorri as the author or at least one of the authors of the Edda.

Contents
Prologue

The Prologue is the first section of four books of the Prose Edda, consisting of a euhemerized Christian account of the origins of Norse mythology: the Nordic gods are described as human Trojan warriors who left Troy after the fall of that city (an origin which parallels Virgil's Aeneid).

GylfaginningGylfaginning (Old Icelandic 'the tricking of Gylfi') follows the Prologue in the Prose Edda. Gylfaginning deals with the creation and destruction of the world of the Nordic gods, and many other aspects of Norse mythology. The section is written in prose interspersed with quotes from eddic poetry.

SkáldskaparmálSkáldskaparmál (Old Icelandic 'the language of poetry') is the third section of Edda, and consists of a dialogue between Ægir, a jötunn who is one of various personifications of the sea, and Bragi, a skaldic god, in which both Norse mythology and discourse on the nature of poetry are intertwined. The origin of a number of kennings are given and Bragi then delivers a systematic list of kennings for various people, places, and things. Bragi then goes on to discuss poetic language in some detail, in particular heiti, the concept of poetical words which are non-periphrastic, for example "steed" for "horse", and again systematises these. This section contains numerous quotes from skaldic poetry.

HáttatalHáttatal (Old Icelandic "list of verse-forms") is the last section of  Prose Edda. The section is composed by the Icelandic poet, politician, and historian Snorri Sturluson. Primarily using his own compositions, it exemplifies the types of verse forms used in Old Norse poetry.  Snorri took a prescriptive as well as descriptive approach; he has systematized the material, often noting that the older poets did not always follow his rules.

 Translations 
The Prose Edda has been the subject of numerous translations:

 , 3 volumes

  , e-text via www.gutenberg.org (1901 ed.) 
  

  , 2 volumes : 1 facsimile; 2 translation and notes
  , 2 volumes : 1 facsimile; 2 translation and notes

 
 
 
  , norse with English translation

 Editions 

 
  , Norse text and English notes

See also
 Edda
 Saga
 Heimskringla Notes 

 References 

Faulkes, Anthony. 1977. "Edda", Gripla II,  Reykjavík . Online. Last accessed August 12, 2020.
Faulkes, Anthony. Trans. 1982. Edda. Oxford University Press.
Faulkes, Anthony. 2005. Edda: Prologue and Gylfaginning. Viking Society for Northern Research. Online. Last accessed August 12, 2020.
Gísli Sigurðsson. 1999. "Eddukvæði". Mál og menning. .
Gylfi Gunnlaugsson. 2019. "Norse Myths, Nordic Identities: The Divergent Case of Icelandic Romanticism" in Simon Halik (editor). Northern Myths, Modern Identities, 73–86. ISBN 9789004398436_006
Haukur Þorgeirsson. 2017. "A Stemmic Analysis of the 'Prose Edda'". Saga-Book, 41. Online. Last accessed August 12, 2020.
Ross, Margaret Clunies. 2011. A History of Old Norse Poetry and Poetics. DS Brewer. ISBN 978-1-84384-279-8
Wanner, Kevin J. 2008. Snorri Sturluson and the Edda: The Conversion of Cultural Capital in Medieval Scandinavia. University of Toronto Press. 

External links
 Hopkins, Joseph S. 2019. "Edda to English: A Survey of English Language Translations of the Prose Edda" at Mimisbrunnr.info
  (plain text, HTML and other)
 Langeslag, Paul Sander. Undated''. "Old Norse editions" at Septentrionalia.net

1220s books
Icelandic literature
Medieval literature
Old Norse literature
Old Norse prose
Scandinavian folklore
Sources of Norse mythology
Works by Snorri Sturluson